Tipping may refer to:
Tip (law enforcement)
A piece of advice (opinion)
Gratuity, also called tipping
Tipping (surname)
Tipping baronets, a title in the Baronetage of England
Norsk Tipping, the national lottery of Norway

See also
Cow tipping, a rumored activity involving pushing over a sleeping cow
Fly-tipping, British term for illegally dumping waste
Footy tipping, a competition involving picking winning sports teams over a given season
Gate fee, or tipping fee, a charge levied based on quantity of waste
Tipping point (disambiguation)